Yvonne Carole Grace Murray-Mooney  (née Murray, born 4 October 1964), is a Scottish former middle-distance and long-distance track and road-running athlete. She won a bronze medal in the 3000 metres at the 1988 Olympic Games, and gold medals at this distance at the 1987 European Indoor Championships, the 1993 World Indoor Championships and the 1990 European Championships. She also won a gold medal in the 10,000 metres at the 1994 Commonwealth Games. Her 3000 metres best of 8:29.02 was set in the Olympic Final of 1988.

Biography 
Yvonne Murray was born on 4 October 1964 in Musselburgh, East Lothian, Scotland.

Murray was initially a Hockey player for Musselburgh Grammar School prior to taking up athletics in 1979.

Murray first competed on the international stage as a 16 year old representing Scotland at the 1981 IAAF World Cross Country Championships in Madrid, where she finished 79th in the senior women's race. Later that year she represented Great Britain at the European Junior Championships in Utrecht, Holland where she finished 6th in the 3000m event.

Murray's first major senior championship appearance was at aged 18 years, where she finished 10th in both the 1500m and 3000m finals at the 1982 Commonwealth Games in Brisbane.

Her first major athletics medal was a bronze in the 3000m event at the 1985 European Athletics Indoor Championships in Piraeus, Greece.

In 1986, she won the silver medal in the 3000m event at the European Athletics Indoor Championships in Madrid, a bronze medal in the 3000m event at the 1986 Commonwealth Games in Edinburgh and a bronze medal again in the 3000m event at the 1986 European Championships in Stuttgart.

In 1987 she broke the championship record to win the 3000m at the 1987 European Athletics Indoor Championships in Lievin.

At the 1988 Olympic Games in Seoul, she won a bronze medal in the 3000m event, having taken the race on at 500m from the finish line. The winner, Tetyana Samolenko of the Soviet Union, tested positive for PEDS in 1993 and received a two year ban from the sport. Murray never had her Olympic medal upgraded.

In 1989 Murray won the 3000m event at the IAAF Grand Prix Final in Monaco and at the IAAF World Cup in Barcelona while representing Europe, becoming the first UK Female athlete to win a World Cup track event.

In January 1990, at the Commonwealth Games in Auckland, she won silver in the 3000m event behind Canada's Angela Chalmers, with fellow Scot Liz McColgan third. Later that year, she won a gold medal in the 3000m event at the 1990 European Athletics Championships in Split, Yugoslavia.

She competed at the 1992 Olympic Games where she finished 8th in the 3000 metres event.

Murray won a gold medal at the 1993 IAAF World Indoor Championships in Toronto, again in the 3000m event, breaking away from the field after 1000m and winning the race by over 10 seconds, becoming the first UK Female athlete to win a World Indoor title.

In 1994, she won the silver medal in the 3000m event at the European Athletics Championships in Helsinki, behind Sonia O'Sullivan of Ireland and then went on to win a gold medal in the 10,000m event at the 1994 Commonwealth Games at Victoria, Canada. On her return from Canada, she won her second IAAF World Cup 3000m title in London.

Murray has won a full set of medals at the European Indoor Championships, European Outdoor Championships and the Commonwealth Games.

Murray was also a UK champion at 5000 metres in 1983 and at 3000 metres in 1985 and 1987. She was six-times AAA champion outdoors, and AAA indoor 3000m champion in 1984. Murray was five-times Scottish outdoor champion. Murray qualified for at least one track final in every major international championship that she contested throughout her career.

Murray has held the Commonwealth 2000m record since 1986, breaking her own record in 1994 with a time of 5:26.93.

Murray was awarded an MBE in 1990, was voted BBC Scotland Sports Personality of the Year in 1994 and was inducted into the Scottish Sports Hall of Fame in 2007.

As at 2021, Murray remains Scotland's most decorated individual athlete in Olympic, World, European, Commonwealth and World Cup competition, having won 13 medals in individual events.

Achievements

Note: At the 1989 World Cup, Murray was representing Europe.

References

External links

1964 births
Living people
Members of the Order of the British Empire
Commonwealth Games bronze medallists for Scotland
Commonwealth Games gold medallists for Scotland
Commonwealth Games silver medallists for Scotland
Olympic bronze medallists for Great Britain
Athletes (track and field) at the 1982 Commonwealth Games
Athletes (track and field) at the 1986 Commonwealth Games
Athletes (track and field) at the 1990 Commonwealth Games
Athletes (track and field) at the 1994 Commonwealth Games
Athletes (track and field) at the 1988 Summer Olympics
Athletes (track and field) at the 1992 Summer Olympics
Olympic athletes of Great Britain
Sportspeople from Musselburgh
Commonwealth Games medallists in athletics
Scottish Olympic medallists
Scottish female middle-distance runners
Scottish female long-distance runners
European Athletics Championships medalists
Medalists at the 1988 Summer Olympics
Olympic bronze medalists in athletics (track and field)
World Athletics Indoor Championships winners
People educated at Musselburgh Grammar School
20th-century Scottish women
21st-century Scottish women
Medallists at the 1986 Commonwealth Games
Medallists at the 1990 Commonwealth Games
Medallists at the 1994 Commonwealth Games